Ranunculus sulphureus is a species of flowering plant belonging to the family Ranunculaceae.

It is native to the Subarctic.

References

sulphureus